Jung Yong-Hoon  (11 March 1979 – 31 August 2003) was a South Korean footballer.

He competed at the 1998 AFC Youth Championship, where the South Korea U-20 team won for the ninth title.

He died in a car accident in Seoul on 31 August 2003.

References

External links 

1979 births
2003 deaths
Association football midfielders
South Korean footballers
Suwon Samsung Bluewings players
Korean Police FC (Semi-professional) players
K League 1 players
Footballers from Seoul
Road incident deaths in South Korea